Misrod railway station (station code:- MSO) is a suburban railway station of Bhopal, Madhya Pradesh. Its code is MSO. It serves Misrod area of the Bhopal city. The station consists of 3 platforms. The platform is well sheltered. It has many facilities including water and sanitation.

Major trains
 Panchvalley Fast Passenger
 Itarsi–Jhansi Passenger

References

Railway stations in Bhopal
Bhopal railway division